TrønderBilene AS is a bus company operating in Trøndelag, Norway. As of 2009, it has 324 employees and 238 buses, and is owned by  Torghatten ASA. The company operates both coach, bus, charter and school routes, as well as some truck and garage services. The areas of operation are Innherred, Namdalen, Fosen, Hitra and Frøya. TrønderBilene runs three town bus services: Buster in Steinkjer, Blåmann in Levanger and Verdalsøra, and Elgen in Namsos. The coach service from Namsos to Trondheim is part of NOR-WAY Bussekspress.

The company was founded in 1920 as the county-owned Fylkesbilene i Nord-Trøndelag (FBNT), when the county took over four bus companies. In 1998, the company changed its name and was converted to a limited company. The following year, the county council sold a majority share.

Operation

TrønderBilene is an operator of scheduled, charter and school buses, as well as trucks and mechanical services. The main areas of operation are the districts of Innherred, Namdal and Fosen, and the islands of Hitra and Frøya. As of 2009, the company has 324 employees who do 285 man-years. TrønderBilene has 238 buses, and the majority of these are used for school transport. The scheduled bus transport is on contract with Trøndelag County Municipality based on concessions with subsidies. The company also operates urban buses in four towns in Trøndelag: Buster in Steinkjer, Blåmann in Levanger and Verdalsøra, and Elgen in Namsos. The express bus from Namsos via Steinkjer to Trondheim operates as part of NOR-WAY Bussekspress. Bus transport accounts for 80% of the company's revenue.

The company has three main mechanical depots, in Åfjord, Namsos, and Namsos, as well as four garages in Frosta, Kolvereid, Levanger, and Rissa. Twenty-four people work at the garages, and the company sells services to other bus and truck operators. The company also operates trucks on contract with Schenker.

TrønderBilene is owned 66% by Fosen Trafikklag and 34% by Nord-Trøndelag County Municipality. The head office is located in Levanger. The company holds a 39.13% ownership in Gauldal Billag (that also owns Østerdal Billag) and a 22.7% ownership in Namsos Trafikkselskap.

History

Predecessors
The first bus service in Nord-Trøndelag opened on 25 July 1908, when Stenkjær og Namsos Automobilselskap started a service from Steinkjer to Rødhammeren. The route started at Steinkjer Station, where it connected to the Hell–Sunnan Line that had opened three years earlier, and ran to the south shore of the river Namsen, where a ferry took passengers to Namsos. The company bought two seven-seat Rex Simplex cars, that made the  route in two and a half hours. The line was the second in Norway and the first to also carry post.

The next bus company to start in Nord-Trøndelag was Namdalen Automobilselskap. In June 1913, it started a route from Namsos to Fiskum, using a seven-seat Labuire. The route was later the same year extended to Brekkvasselv. The following year, the route was further extended to Gjersvika. By 1920, the company had six cars. In Verdal, John Fiske started a route from Verdalsøra and Verdal Station on the Hell–Sunnan Line, to Sandvika, adjacent the Swedish border. Fiske bought two Dodge cars, that were still in service in 1920. Inderøy Automobillag was founded in 1917, and operated a route from Røra Station on the Hell–Sunnan Line via Straumen to Utøy.

Establishment
The idea to have a county-owned bus company was launched by engineer Emil Astrup, who was head of the Public Roads Administration in Nord-Trøndelag. He wrote a letter in 1918, where he stated that it would be more operationally efficient and easier to coordinate traffic if the bus routes in the county were merged into a single entity that was controlled by a political body. He also wanted to introduce cross subsidies, where profitable routes on main roads would pay the losses suffered on marginal routes in less populated areas. The money was borrowed as county-guaranteed bonds. The purchase gave Fylkesbilene 18 cars.

Fylkesbilene i Nord-Trøndelag was established as a county agency, with County Governor Halvor Bachke Guldahl as the first chair. The board was identical to the County Road Board. In addition to the existing routes, the company established new routes from Steinkjer to Ogndal, from Steinkjer to Kvam, from Verdalsøra to Grunnan, from Namsos to Nordli and from Namsos via Høylandet to Kongsmo. The routes were largely planned to supplement the railway line, that would operate as the main artery north–south through Innherred. The company also took over the operation of the ferry from Rødhammeren to Namsos. It took over the ferry Oma that had been in service since 1912. Oma was 28.13 tonnes and had a capacity for 50 passengers. It was replaced by the 100-passenger Kaulgarden in 1921, that was in service until 1924, when a bridge was opened. This was the only ferry service operated by Fylkesbilene.

Pre-war operations
The first year of operation showed 21,000 passengers and a profit of NOK 41,000. During 1920, there was a strike in the Norwegian State Railways, and Fylkesbilene had to operate a post car on the route from Trondheim via Steinkjer to Sunnan. The company's first head office was at Grand Hotell in Steinkjer, a block away from the railway station. In 1929, the Nordland Line opened from Sunnan via Snåsa to Grong, and the bus route was terminated. In 1928, the company bought its first buses, a series of 16 and 22-seat vehicles from Strømmens Værksted. Studebakers were introduced in 1937 and Volvos in 1938. A bus terminal and offices were built in the center of Steinkjer in 1938. In 1938, the route from Steinkjer to Follafoss and from Steinkjer to Sandvollan, Kjerknesvågen and Utøy were opened.

At the break-out of World War II in Norway on 9 April 1940, all the company's buses were taken over by the armed forces. From 17 May, the buses were returned to the company, but quotas for petrol were introduced, and the company was forced to install wood gasifiers on its fleet. Both Steinkjer and Namsos were bombed in 1940, but in both towns the company's facilities survived, except the garage in Steinkjer. The buses were at the time spread around the county, and only a single bus was destroyed. After the war ended in 1945, the company had 21 operational buses. The company needed to have a license to purchase buses, and in the following five years, 17 buses were bought for about NOK 1 million. They were mostly Volvos and Scania-Vabis, including one from the municipal bus company in Høylandet. In 1946, Fylkesbilene bought Kvam Billag and the routes from Steinkjer to Øvre Kvam. At the same time, the route to Follafoss was extended to the county border. From 1 January 1948, Fylkesbilene bought the private bus operators in Ytre Namdal, and started routes from Vikna, Nærøy, Leka and Bindal via Ottersøy to Namsos. The company in Høylandet was bought to allow direct connection from Ytre Namdal via Høylandet to Grong. The same year, the company introduced a direct service between Verdalsøra and Levanger, that previously had only been served by the railway.

Post-war operations

On 16 December 1948, the snowmobile route from Steinfjellet to Gjersvika was opened. Within two weeks, additional routes were introduced from Brekkvasselv to Gjersvika and over Lifjellet. The company had four Bombardier vehicles for the routes. The routes were terminated in the early 1960s, when proper roads were built. A new bus station opened in Namsos in 1953, with the city receiving a new garage three years later. Routes from Steinkjer to Stod were started in 1961, after Fylkesbilene bought Østgårds, and the following year from Steinkjer to Vingsand. From 1964, the board was no longer identical to the County Road Board, but was instead directly appointed by the county council.

In 1965, Fylkesbilene attempted an airport coach service from Steinkjer and Levanger to Trondheim Airport, Værnes, but failed to make money and terminated it the same year. The same year, the company established a route from Vanvikan via Leksvik to Mosvik and onwards to Steinkjer. From 1 January 1967, the company took over the route Vanvikan–Kråkmo and started a direct service from Leksvik to Trondheim. In 1966, the first town buses were introduced in Namsos, in 1967, a direct route from Namsos via Foldereid to Rørvik was introduced, and on 1 February 1968, the company took over Olav Hårberg's route from Namsos to Kjerstivika. From 1 July 1969, a combined bus and cargo route was established from Namsos to Sørli. The company's main depot was opened on 25 November 1969 outside Steinkjer, and cost NOK 2 million.

In 1972, the company opened a garage in Verdal for NOK 680,000. It was supplemented by two urban services, to Brannan and Ydsedalen, in 1975. In 1973, Fylkesbilene introduced a route parallel to the Nordland Line from Steinkjer via Snåsa to Grong. Routes in Beitstad were taken over from Ivar Sems Bilruter on 1 November 1976. School routes in Overhalla were taken over in 1977. In 1978, passenger transport on the Namsos Line from Grong to Namsos was terminated, and Fylkesbilene took over the route. On 1 April 1979, Fylkesbilene took over the routes and nine buses in Levanger from Fjerdingen Busselskap, including five scheduled services and four school services.

On 29 April 1979, Fylkesbilene opened its combined bus station and train station at Steinkjer Station. It was the first such combined station in Norway, having cost NOK 3.7 million. In 1981, Fylkesbilene bought Arne Bruem's concessions and buses that operated the town bus in Steinkjer. From 1 September 1985, the infrastructure was upgrade and higher frequency introduced. The yellow Buster buses were introduced on the town routes in 1991. A garage was opened in Kolvereid in 1979, costing NOK 1.5 million. From 15 September 1983, Fylkesbilene started distribution of food produce from the cooperatives Namdalsmeieriet, Bøndenes Salgslag and Gartnerhallen to food stores in Namdalen, in a cooperation to reduce transport costs. In Verdalsøra, the company opened a bus station at Verdal Station on 1 October 1983 for NOK 2 million. In 1985, the bus route from Ytre Namdal was moved, so it went to Grong instead of Namsos.

A town bus service was introduced in Levanger in 1985. In 1989, a new garage opened in Levanger. The same year, the company introduced the Environment Card monthly pass, that halved the price. The following year, the company's ridership doubled. 1990 also saw the introduction of a new livery: the old brown, red and beige colors were replaced with a "eurowhite" livery with a brown, red and beige cheatline. From 1994, the Blåmann town bus branding was introduced in Levanger and Verdal.

TrønderReiser
The work to establish a charter division began in the early 1980s, when the company realized that it had a large amount of idle capacity during the daytime, in the evenings and in the weekends. A concession was granted in 1983 and the first trip was from Follafoss to Meråker for two days. In 1984, eight trips were offered, and six were made. Sales were done through Bennett Reisebureau and NSB Reisebyrå. By 1986, the division had a revenue of NOK 4 million. By 1994, it had reached 17 million and offered 92 trips. That year, the division was rebranded TrønderReiser. TrønderReiser was in 1997 sold to some of the employees. In 1999, it was taken over by Sende Busstrafikk, but the company was not making money and filed for bankruptcy in December 2000.

Privatization

A project group concluded in 1996 that the agency should be converted to a limited company. TrønderBilene was converted to a limited company from 1 January 1998, and at the same time Managing Director Alf Kroglund announced that he wanted to merge, join an alliance or sell part of the company. Three companies bid for part or all of TrønderBilene: Fosen Trafikklag, Hemne og Orkladal Billag and the consortium NT-Buss, led by Namsos Trafikkselskap. In October, the board rejected all the bids, stating that they were too low. The bid from Fosen involved them purchasing 66% of the company, while the other bids were for 100% of the shares. Fosen also proposed transferring Fosen's and Fosen's largest owner, Torghatten Trafikkselskap's bus divisions to TrønderBilene, and base the new company in Steinkjer.

On 20 January 1999, the county council approved the Fosen bid, who paid NOK 29.7 million for the company. The Socialist Left Party and the Liberal Party were the only to vote against the sale. In March 2000, TrønderBilene announced the take-over of Fosen's bus divisions, as well as the ownership of Fosen's subsidiary Bilruta Frosta–Åsen from 1 January 2001. The take-over increased TrønderBilene's revenue from NOK 100 to 180 million. At the same time, the company started serving Trondheim Airport, Værnes with its coach service from Namsos to Trondheim. TrønderBilenes fleet increased by 95 vehicles to 210 buses and trucks. The plans to include Torghatten's bus routes in the take-over were canceled. The take-over was financed through a NOK 11.4 million private placement by the two owners.

In 2002, the company applied to start a coach service from Trondheim to Bodø in cooperation with SB Nordlandsbuss, and concession was granted by the Ministry of Transport and Communications the following year. The concession had been supported by the county council in Nord-Trøndelag, but their administration and the county council in Nordland was opposed because the coach service would take customers away from the railway. The route started on 1 March 2004. The route was terminated from 1 September, because the company failed to make it profitable. On 1 March 2003, TrønderBilene moved its head office from Steinkjer to Levanger. In 2003, the company increased its subsidies by NOK 8 million and its profits by NOK 4.8 million to 11.7 million. In June 2004, TrønderBilene bought 39% of Gauldal Billag from several private investors. The company held a 23% market share in Sør-Trøndelag, and the remaining shares were owned by the municipalities of Røros, Holtålen and Midtre Gauldal. From 1 January 2006, TrønderBilene merged with its subsidiary Bilrute Frosta–Åsen. In January 2007, TrønderBilene increased their ownership in Namsos Trafikkselskap from 8.7 to 20.7%, becoming the company's second-largest owner after Helgelandske.

References

Biography

Bus companies of Trøndelag
Transport companies established in 1920
1920 establishments in Norway
Companies formerly owned by municipalities of Norway
Torghatten ASA
Nor-Way Bussekspress operators
Companies based in Levanger
Companies based in Steinkjer
Trøndelag County Municipality